Aksha may refer to:
Aksha, Sudan, site of a Temple of Ramesses II
Tuvan akşa, the currency of Tuva between 1934 and 1944
Aksha, Kazakhstan, a populated place in Kazakhstan
Aksha, Russia, a rural locality (a selo) in Zabaykalsky Krai, Russia
Aksha River, a river in Zabaykalsky Krai, Russia
Akshayakumara, one of the sons of Ravana in the Hindu mythology
Aksha Pardasany, an Indian actress